The Aditya Birla Group is an Indian multinational conglomerate. Headquartered in Mumbai, it operates in 100 countries with more than 140,000 employees directly and indirectly. The group was founded by Seth Shiv Narayan Birla in 1857. The group has interests in viscose staple fibre, metals, cement (largest in India), viscose filament yarn, branded apparel, carbon black, chemicals, fertilisers, insulators, financial services and telecom.

History

It is one of India's largest corporate houses operating in 26 countries – India, Germany, the United Kingdom, Brazil, Italy, Hungary, United States, Canada, France, Australia, Egypt, Luxembourg, Philippines, the United Arab Emirates, Switzerland, Singapore, Myanmar, China, Thailand, Laos, Bangladesh, Indonesia, Malaysia, Bahrain, Vietnam and South Korea. The company is majorly engaged in the business of non-ferrous metals, viscose filament yarn, viscose staple fiber, cement, fertilizers, chemicals, branded apparel, carbon black, sponge iron, telecom, IT services, financial services, insulators, and business process outsourcing.

In 2022 it was reported that the company was investing US$2.5 billion into an aluminum plant in Alabama. Forbes in October 2022 listed the group's employee number at 30,878, with Kumar Mangalam Birla still in position as the chairman.

Units and investment areas

Non-ferrous metals

Cement

Textile and fibres

The Aditya Birla Group is the world's largest producer of Viscose staple fibre. It operates from India, Laos, Thailand, Malaysia and China. It owns the Birla Cellulose brand. Apart from viscose staple fibre, the group also owns acrylic fibre business in Thailand, viscose filament yarn businesses and spinning mills in India and Southeast Asia. The group has pulp and plantation interests in Canada and Laos. It also owns the Domsjö factory in Sweden which exports viscose. The Swedish government is hoping to negotiate further investments in Sweden, in particular in the hyper-modern future biorefinery in the city of Örnsköldsvik.  Its two companies i.e. Aditya Birla Nuvo Ltd and Grasim Bhiwani Textiles Ltd which is a subsidiary of Grasim Industries are in textile business. Grasim Industries was recently placed 154th in a list of the world's best regarded firms compiled by Forbes.

Fashion

Telecom services

The Aditya Birla group owns 27.4% of the mobile network operator Vodafone Idea, branded as Vi.

Idea Cellular was started as a joint venture of Aditya Birla Group with AT&T and the Tata Group, which was widely also known as BATATA (Birla+AT+Tata). After an IPO on the Indian stock markets, Idea Cellular accounted for a third of the group's market capitalisation. The company is headquartered in Mumbai. In August 2019, Idea Cellular merged with Vodafone India and thereby became largest telecom company in terms of subscribers and revenue, surpassing Airtel.

Financial services

Aditya Birla Capital
Aditya Birla Capital (ABC) is the umbrella brand for all the financial services business of the Aditya Birla Group. The financial services arm of the group is headed by Ajay Srinivasan. Birla Sun Life Asset Management is part of the group.

See also

 Birla family
 Birla Foundation
 Yash Birla Group
 CK Birla Group
 Columbian Chemicals Plant explosion hoax in Centerville, St Mary Parish, Louisiana

References

External links 
 

 
Multinational companies headquartered in India
Companies based in Mumbai
Chemical companies established in 1857
Manufacturing companies established in 1857
Indian companies established in 1857